Arandas is a commune in the Ain department in the Auvergne-Rhône-Alpes region of eastern France.

Geography
Arandas is some 50 km north-west of Aix-les-Bains and 10 km south-west of Hauteville-Lompnes.  It can be accessed by the D104 from Argis in the north running south to the village then continuing south as the D104A through the heart of the commune to join the D32 south of the commune.  The D104 itself reverses direction in the village and heads north-west to join the D73. The commune has some farmland but is heavily forested and mountainous. There are no villages or hamlets in the commune other than Arandas.

The Bossiere stream rises near the village and flows west to join the Galine river. The Ruisseau de Grinand also rises in the north of the commune, forming part of the northern boundary before flowing into the Galine.

History
In the Middle Ages Arandas was a lordship with the most famous lord being the poet Claude Guichard in the 16th century. The commune was separated from Conand in 1865.

Administration

Population

Personalities
Anthelme Ferrand (1758-1834), politician, member of the Convention and the Council of Five Hundred was born in the commune.

See also
 Communes of the Ain department

External links
 Arandas on the old National Geographic Institute website 
Arandas on Géoportail, National Geographic Institute (IGN) website 
Arandas on the 1750 Cassini Map

References

Communes of Ain